Catherine Manners may refer to:

Catherine Manners, Duchess of Rutland (1657–1733), English noblewoman
Catherine Manners (1675–1722), wife of John Leveson-Gower, 1st Baron Gower
Catherine Manners (died 1780), wife of Henry Pelham
Catherine Gray, Lady Manners (c. 1766–1852), Anglo-Irish aristocrat and poet
Catherine Stepney (1778–1845), British novelist